Ptychadena newtoni is a species of frog in the family Ptychadenidae. It is endemic to the island of São Tomé in São Tomé and Príncipe, where it occurs up to 600 metres elevation. Its natural habitats are swamps, freshwater marshes, arable land, plantations, rural gardens, urban areas, heavily degraded former forest, ponds, and canals and ditches. It is threatened by habitat loss. The animal was first described as Rana newtoni by Bocage in 1886. The species is named after Francisco Xavier Oakley de Aguiar Newton (1864–1909).

References

Ptychadena
Endemic fauna of São Tomé Island
Amphibians described in 1886
Taxonomy articles created by Polbot